Phiroj Shyangden is an Indian singer (American citizen), guitarist, composer, songwriter in the Nepali language. He is the founding member of the band 1974 AD and The Original Duo. Shyangden lives in New York, USA.

Early life 
Phiroj Shyangden was born to parents Kharkey Shyangden (father) and the late Narbada  Shyangden (mother) in Takvar Tea Estate, Darjeeling, India. He went to Betten High School in Tukvar, Darjeeling and completed his college degree form Darjeeling Government College, North Bengal University, India in 1986. 

Shyangden is a self-taught vocalist and studied western classical music (guitar) from Jeeven Pradhan (Darjeeling Melody Academy), a noted music teacher from Darjeeling. Shyangden moved to Kathmandu in 1990 where he worked as a music teacher in Gyanodaya School, Lalitpur.

Musical career 

Shyangden, along with Nirakar Yakthumba (bass guitar) and Bhanu Ahamed (drums), formed the band 1974 AD in 1994 whilst they were teachers in Gyanodaya School in Lalitpur, Kathmandu. During this period Shyangden did most of the writing and compositions for the band. Initially the band played western rock music and covered Bryan Adams, Deep Purple and various other rock acts.

Shyangden left 1974 AD in 2008 amicably to pursue a solo career and moved to New York in 2009. He released a self-titled studio solo album, followed by Zindagi Asal Cha.

The Original Duo 
In 2016 Shyangden and Pradhan reunited under the name 'The Original Duo'. They toured five states in the US in 2016, and Nepal, the UK, and Australia in 2017–18.

In 2019 The Original Duo recorded and released the album La Hai, with lyrics and composition by Shyangden.

Reunion with 1974 AD 
In July 2019, after almost a decade, Shyangden and Pradhan reunited with 1974 AD and released a new album titled Nirantarata. The band now consists of the original lineup.

Awards (with 1974 AD)

Discography

Albums with 1974 AD 

 Time Out (1996)
 Samjhi Baschu (1998)
 Satabdi (2001)
 Jungi Nishan (2002)
 Limited Edition (2002)
 Pinjada Ko Suga (2004)
 On Air (2007)
 Nirantarta (2019)

Solo albums 

 Phiroj Shyangden
 Zindagi Asal Cha

Singles 
Timi ra Ma

See also 

Navneet Aditya Waiba
Music of Nepal
 Nepalese Rock

References

External links 
Phiroj Shyangden official YouTube channel
Phiroj Shyangden Facebook page

 People from Darjeeling district
Nepali-language singers from India
 Singers from West Bengal
 Indian male songwriters
Indian guitarists